It's All About You is a four-song EP written and produced by singer, songwriter, and Chicago musician Rebecca F.

Rebecca F.'s interest in the meme — "an idea, behavior, or style that spreads from person to person within a culture" — led to the band name "Rebecca F. & The Memes." In a 2006 interview, she said: "A meme is a cultural gene.  [W]e humans by consensus determine what cultural information is valuable enough to pass from one generation to the next.  The question is: What memes are we passing on in the modern world?"

From 2000 to 2002 Rebecca F. was contracted to a development deal by R. Kelly for his vanity label Rockland Records during which time she recorded and produced her own songs.

Track listing

"Judas" plagiarism lawsuit
The song "Juda", released on this album, was written by Rebecca F. and copyrighted in 1999.

Lady Gaga and "Judas"
In August 2011, Rebecca F., born Rebecca Francescatti, filed a lawsuit in Illinois Northern District Court's Chicago Office known as Francescatti v. Germanotta et al. The complaint alleges: "Lady Gaga, her music labels, and one of the musicians who allegedly wrote 17 of Gaga's songs for her 'Born This Way' album are sued for copyright infringement, accused by Chicago composer and performing artist Rebecca Francescatti of using her 1999 copyright-protected work "Juda" in Gaga's Judas, purportedly via defendant Gaynor."

Brian Joseph Gaynor, a member of DJ White Shadow, LLC, "collaborated with Lady Gaga in writing and producing 17 of 20 songs recorded" on "Born This Way." Gaynor was the recording engineer and mixer for Rebecca F.'s album "It's All About You," which included the song "Juda."

"Judas" and Jennifer Lopez's "Invading My Mind" 
Francescatti's law team entered evidence in December 2012 that Gaga used an additional unlicensed sample in "Judas" and then incorporated it into "Invading My Mind". They claimed that Lady Gaga asked Jennifer Lopez for a credit on "Invading My Mind" to "cover her tracks", suggesting that she did not even contribute to the song.  

Francescatti's team claimed to "uncover text messages between Gaga and RedOne proving that she had stolen the sample loop used in both 'Judas' and 'Invading My Mind'".

Summary judgment 
In June 2014, Federal Judge Marvin Aspen (b. 1934) dismissed the lawsuit without trial through an award of Summary Judgment for lacking "ordinary observer" qualities:

Judge Aspen ruled for the Plaintiff (Francescatti) that a reasonable juror could find that Germanotta had access to Francescatti's work. The judge described this "channel of communication" between the parties as a "nexus".  He concludes that bassist Brian Gaynor worked on Francescatti's song before collaborating with Lady Gaga:

Therefore Judge Aspen denied Germanotta et al.'s argument that there was no access between the parties.

Judge Aspen concluded that certain elements of the Plaintiff's song that were alleged and argued to be points of infringement actually constituted evidence that Lady Gaga independently created Judas. Judge Aspen wrote:

Responses to dismissal

One of the attorneys for Lady Gaga made the following statement:

In a statement following Judge Aspen's ruling, Francescatti said her plight had been a "David versus Goliath struggle".

Rolling Stone music writer Daniel Kreps observed:

Lady Gaga sues Rebecca F. for $1.4 million

In September 2014 Lady Gaga filed court documents to collect $1.4 million from Rebecca Francescatti (Rebecca F.). The singer "claim[s] back close to $1.4 million that she paid her lawyers over the course of the three year case" and "has requested Rebecca foot the staggering bill."

Rebecca F.'s response to the lawsuit, "Why You Should Care that Lady Gaga is Suing Me for $1.4 Million Dollars" elucidates her copyright infringement allegations for the first time. In November 2014 she was forced to remove the essay from her website.

Harassment 

Harassment of the "Juda" songwriter has been ongoing since August 2011. In response, Rebecca F. wrote and posted the YouTube single "I Don't Believe In Monsters" featuring snapshots of bullying comments, including death threats.

In an interview for her four-song self-released EP "It's All About You," F. said:

References

External links
 Justia Dockets & Filing entry on the 2011 lawsuit
 iTunes listing

2006 EPs
Albums involved in plagiarism controversies
Bullying
Works about Internet memes